Kohjapyx is a genus of diplurans in the family Japygidae.

Species
 Kohjapyx lindbergi Pagés, 1962
 Kohjapyx serfatyi Pagés, 1953
 Kohjapyx uchleri (Pagés, 1962)

References

Diplura